Dome Pipe Organ, the second largest pipe organ in Latvia, is located in Riga Cathedral. The largest mechanical pipe organ in Latvia is located in Liepāja Holy Trinity Cathedral.

History 

The first known Riga Cathedral organ was the largest in the world, but it was lost in 1547 during a fire. In the 16th century, the Cathedral Church built a new organ, which sounded for 280 years. Jacob Raab made out of the damaged organ's remains a prospect in mannerism style with some baroque elements complemented latter by other masters. Today the vocal organ is more than a century old; it is built by the German firm E.F. Walcker & Sons in Ludwigsburg in 1882-83 and it was inaugurated on January 31, 1884. In 1983 the organ was reconstructed by Flentrop Orgelbouw of Zaandam, Netherlands, so it retained its distinctive sound and look. During the reconstruction the organ was completely dismantled and then reassembled, the second console was restored and later added three stops.

Specification 

The instrument is playable from two consoles. Its main console is located at the upper gallery and has 4 manuals and a pedal. The second console is on the lower gallery and it duplicates the fourth manual of the main console. The organ has 124 stops, which sound from 6,718 pipes arranged on 26 wind chests. The longest pipe is about 10 metres long, the shortest one is only 13 mm. Pipe diameters are from 50 cm to 4 mm. The materials used in the pipes include pine, fir, maple, oak, beech, and pear and different metal alloys. There are 116 voices, 144 ranks; 18 combinations and General Crescendo.

 Couplers: II/I, III/I, IV/I, III/II, IV/II, I/P, II/P, III/P, IV/P, I–IV/P, P/I („noli me tangere“).

References

External links 

 YouTube - Riga 'Dome' Cathedral, Organ Recital

Latvian musical instruments
Individual pipe organs